Stenoma orneopis is a moth of the family Depressariidae. It is found in Amazonas, Brazil.

The wingspan is about 14 mm. The forewings are ochreous-grey brownish, with a strong violet gloss. The extreme costal edge is white and there is a rounded rosy-ochreous spot on the end of the cell, obscurely edged whitish. Several minute whitish dots are found on the apical margin. The hindwings are blackish grey.

References

Moths described in 1925
Taxa named by Edward Meyrick
Stenoma